Pollestad is a village in Klepp municipality in Rogaland county, Norway. Orre Church is located in Pollestad.

The village has a store, gas station, school, day care, and sports club.

References

Villages in Rogaland
Klepp